Defending champion Gustavo Kuerten defeated Àlex Corretja in the final, 6–7(3–7), 7–5, 6–2, 6–0 to win the men's singles tennis title at the 2001 French Open. It was his third and last French Open title. Kuerten saved a match point en route to the title, against Michael Russell in the fourth round.

This tournament marked the first time that future world No. 1 and 20-time major champion Roger Federer reached a major quarterfinal. He would go on to win the title eight years later.

This was the last major to feature only 16 seeds.

Seeds

Qualifying

Draw

Finals

Top half

Section 1

Section 2

Section 3

Section 4

Bottom half

Section 5

Section 6

Section 7

Section 8

External links
Official Roland Garros 2001 Men's Singles Draw
Main Draw
Qualifying Draw
2001 French Open – Men's draws and results at the International Tennis Federation

Men's Singles
French Open by year – Men's singles
French Open